Involvulus is a genus of leaf and bud weevils in the beetle family Attelabidae. There are more than 40 described species in Involvulus. The genus was first described in 1798 by Franz von Paula Schrank who specified the type species as Involvulus metallicus which is considered to be Involvulus cupreus.

Species
These 47 species belong to the genus Involvulus:

 Involvulus aerosus Voss, 1958
 Involvulus aethiops Formánek, 1911
 Involvulus asperulicollis Voss, 1956
 Involvulus baojiensis Legalov, 2007
 Involvulus berezovskyi Alonso-Zarazaga
 Involvulus caeruleus (De Geer, 1775)
 Involvulus carinaticollis Voss, 1958
 Involvulus cinctellus Voss, 1956
 Involvulus cognatus Voss, 1958
 Involvulus commutatus Voss, 1969
 Involvulus conjunctulus Voss, 1959
 Involvulus continentalis Voss, 1958
 Involvulus coorgensis Voss, 1957
 Involvulus cupreus (Linnaeus & C., 1758)
 Involvulus dentatus Voss, 1953
 Involvulus dundai Alonso-Zarazaga
 Involvulus foochowensis Voss, 1960
 Involvulus germanicus Kuhnt, 1911
 Involvulus hauseri Alonso-Zarazaga
 Involvulus hirtus (Fabricius, 1801)
 Involvulus immixtus Voss, 1969
 Involvulus intrusus Voss, 1957
 Involvulus iranensis Alonso-Zarazaga
 Involvulus kangdingensis Alonso-Zarazaga
 Involvulus kaszabi Voss, 1956
 Involvulus kozlovi Alonso-Zarazaga
 Involvulus legalovi Alonso-Zarazaga
 Involvulus liesenfeldti Voss, 1956
 Involvulus liquidus Voss, 1957
 Involvulus maduranus Voss, 1955
 Involvulus nalandaicus Voss
 Involvulus nathani Voss, 1957
 Involvulus nigrocyaneus Alonso-Zarazaga
 Involvulus parilis Voss, 1956
 Involvulus potanini Alonso-Zarazaga
 Involvulus przhevalskyi Alonso-Zarazaga
 Involvulus pubescens (Fabricius & J.C., 1775)
 Involvulus rottensis Zherikhin, 1992
 Involvulus schochrini Alonso-Zarazaga
 Involvulus semiruberrimus Voss, 1969
 Involvulus setosellus Voss, 1962
 Involvulus siwalikensis Voss, 1956
 Involvulus szechuanensis Voss, 1956
 Involvulus teldeniyana Voss, 1957
 Involvulus wegneri Voss, 1957
 Involvulus xiahensis Alonso-Zarazaga
 Involvulus zhondiensis Alonso-Zarazaga

References

Further reading

External links

 

Attelabidae
Articles created by Qbugbot
Taxa named  by Franz von Paula Schrank
Taxa described in 1798